A. Daniel McKenzie (25 March 1924 – 15 August 1989) was a Progressive Conservative party member of the House of Commons of Canada. McKenzie was born in Winnipeg, Manitoba and became a communication supervisor by career.

He won the seat for the Winnipeg South Centre electoral district in the 1972 federal election and won successive terms in the general elections of 1974, 1979, 1980 and 1984, becoming member for Winnipeg—Assiniboine after riding boundaries were rearranged in 1976.

In October 1987, during his last term, "Fighting Dan" became somewhat infamous for an incident where he shoved fellow MP John Nunziata (Liberal - York-South Weston) in the House of Commons.  He was objecting to Nunziata's sitting in the Prime Minister's seat during a session of Committee of the Whole House.

McKenzie will also be remembered as one of the proponents of the plan to annex the Turks and Caicos Islands into Confederation.

McKenzie left federal politics in 1988 and did not campaign for another term of office in that year's federal elections. He served consecutive terms in the 29th through 33rd Canadian Parliaments.

Electoral history

References

External links
 

1924 births
1989 deaths
Members of the House of Commons of Canada from Manitoba
Progressive Conservative Party of Canada MPs